In number theory, an eigencurve is a rigid analytic curve that parametrizes certain p-adic families of modular forms, and an eigenvariety is a higher-dimensional generalization of this.

References

Modular forms